Cnephasitis is a genus of moths belonging to the family Tortricidae.

Species
Cnephasitis apodicta  Diakonoff, 1974
Cnephasitis dryadarcha  Meyrick, 1912
Cnephasitis meyi Razowski, 2008
Cnephasitis sapana Razowski, 2008
Cnephasitis spinata  Liu & Bai, 1986
Cnephasitis vietnamensis Razowski, 2008

References

 , 2005: World Catalogue of Insects vol. 5 Tortricidae.
 , 1965, Polskie Pismo Ent. 35: 35

External links
tortricidae.com

Polyorthini
Tortricidae genera
Taxa named by Józef Razowski